Yamuna Kachru (यमुना काचरु, (Devanagari)) (5 March 1933 in Purulia, West Bengal, India - 19 April 2013 in Urbana, Illinois) was Professor Emerita of Linguistics at University of Illinois Urbana-Champaign.

Career 

Kachru studied linguistics at Deccan College in Poona, India, and then at the University of London. She later taught Hindi at the School of Oriental and African Studies, London until she moved to the University of Illinois in 1966. She held the post of Professor of Linguistics at the University for almost 40 years.

She wrote a grammar of Hindi based on developments in modern linguistics, and was considered a leading international authority on the language's grammar. She published a series of research articles in applied linguistics, mostly on the problem of linguistic creativity. Kachru also worked on the area of second language acquisition.

Kachru was a co-founder of the International Association of World Englishes.

Awards 

Kachru was the 2004 recipient of the Padmabhushan Dr. Moturi Satyanarayan Award

In September 2006 she received the Presidential Award from the President of India from the president Dr. A. P. J. Abdul Kalam for her contributions to the study of Hindi language.

Personal life 

She was the wife of fellow linguist Braj Kachru, with whom she frequently collaborated. They had two children: Stanford professor Shamit Kachru and physician Amita Kachru.

Books
 "An Introduction to Hindi Syntax" (1967)
 "Aspects of Hindi Grammar" (1980)
 "Intermediate Hindi" (with Rajeshwari Pandharipande, 1983)
 "Hindi" (a grammar, 2006)
 "World Englishes in Asian Contexts" (with Cecil Nelson, 2006)
 "Handbook of World Englishes" (edited with Braj Kachru and Cecil Nelson, 2007)
 "Cultures, Contexts, and World Englishes" (co-authored with Larry Smith, 2008)
 "Language in South Asia" (edited with Braj Kachru and S.N. Sridhar, 2008).

Sources

External links
 In Memoriam: Dr Yamuna Kachru (1933–2013)

Linguists from the United States
Women linguists
University of Illinois Urbana-Champaign faculty
1933 births
2013 deaths
20th-century Indian linguists
21st-century Indian linguists
Alumni of the University of London
Academics of the University of London
Linguists of Hindi